Rhexia alifanus, commonly referred to as savannah meadowbeauty, is a flowering plant in the Rhexia genus. A perennial, it has pink blossoms. It is indigenous to areas of the southeastern United States west to Texas.

Referenced

Rhexia